The Twelve Days of Christmas, also known as Twelvetide, is a festive Christian season celebrating the Nativity of Jesus.

The Twelve Days of Christmas may also refer to:
 "The Twelve Days of Christmas" (song)
 The Twelve Days of Christmas (album), an album by Ross O'Carroll-Kelly
 The Twelve Days of Christmas [Correspondence], a 1998 monologue book by John Julius Cooper